Świecie (formerly ) is a town in northern Poland with 25,968 inhabitants (2006), capital of Świecie County in the Kuyavian-Pomeranian Voivodeship.

Location 

History

A fishermen's village existed at the site of the present-day town in the Early Middle Ages. The area became part of the emerging Polish state in the 10th century. The name of the town comes from the Polish word świecić, which means "to shine". During the period of the fragmentation of Poland, Świecie became the residence of Pomeranian Duke Grzymisław. Grzymisław's duchy included part of Gdańsk Pomerania with prominent towns of Starogard Gdański and Lubiszewo Tczewskie, as well as Skarszewy.

The Teutonic Order conquered Gdańsk in 1309 and in 1310 bought the region in Soldin from the Margraves of Brandenburg, who claimed the region, which however legally formed part of Poland. By then, the settlement already had the status of Civitas, just as Gdańsk and Tczew did. Świecie was granted a municipal form of government by the Teutonic Order, when it was still located on the high west bank of the Vistula. Probably because of destruction by fire, during the period 1338–1375 the town was relocated down into the valley at the Vistula. The town was briefly recaptured by the Poles after their victory in the Battle of Grunwald in 1410.

In 1454, in the beginning stages of the Thirteen Years' War, it was captured by the Prussian Confederation, which opposed Teutonic rule, and upon the request of which King Casimir IV Jagiellon re-incorporated the territory to the Kingdom of Poland that same year. The Teutonic Knights renounced any claims to the town, and recognized it as part of Poland in 1466. Administratively it formed part of the Pomeranian Voivodeship in the province of Royal Prussia in the Greater Poland Province. The town prospered due to its location at the intersection of the Amber Road and the trade route connecting Western Pomerania with Warmia, Masuria and Lithuania. In the 17th century, Świecie suffered as a result of the Swedish invasion of Poland and an epidemic.

In 1772, during the First Partition of Poland, the town was annexed by the Kingdom of Prussia, and as Schwetz was integrated into the newly formed Province of West Prussia. In 1871, it also became part of Germany. The economic development was decisively improved by the connection to the railway network in 1888. In 1905, the town had a Protestant church, two Catholic churches and a synagogue. In 1910, Schwetz had a population of 8,042, of which 4,206 (52.3%) were German-speaking, 3,605 (44.8%) were Polish-speaking and 166 (2.1%) were bilingual in German and another language.

After World War I and the restoration of independent Poland, Świecie was restored by Germany to Poland in 1920 according to the Treaty of Versailles and became part of the Pomeranian Voivodeship of the Second Polish Republic. In 1920, Stanisław Kostka, a distinguished Polish activist who was active in Grudziądz and Świecie under Prussian rule, became the mayor of the town. Stanisław Kostka built new flood embankments that protect Świecie from floods to this day, and under his administration the town developed economically and culturally.

During the Second World War, Nazi Germany occupied Świecie and annexed it on 8 October 1939, making it the seat of the Kreis county of Schwetz. It was administered as part of the Reichsgau Danzig-West Prussia. Prominent Poles were arrested using secret politically targeted hit list and murdered using the Volksdeutscher Selbstschutz paramilitaries. Local Poles were murdered in large massacres in Świecie, Grupa and Mniszek.

The Germans also murdered the staff and 1,350 patients of the local psychiatric hospital in large massacres in the Szpęgawski and Luszkówko forests. Local Poles were also subjected to expulsions.

The town was captured by combined Polish and Soviet forces on February 10, 1945, and restored to Poland, where it became part of the Bydgoszcz Voivodeship formed in 1946 in the People's Republic of Poland. The town grew rapidly with population reaching 13,500 by 1961. Sugar refinery was expanded, meat, cattle feed plants, and mills were built, including the paper factory launched in 1968, with 4,600 employees. In 1988 Świecie was awarded with the Officer's Cross of the Order of Polonia Restituta, one of Poland's highest state orders.

Demographics

Major corporations 
 Mondi Świecie SA (before, known as Mondi Packaging Paper Świecie SA, and Frantschach Świecie SA as well as Celuloza Świecie SA) – paper products and packaging

Education 
 Wyższa Szkoła Menedżerska (Higher School of Management)
 I LO im. Floriana Ceynowy
 II LO w Świeciu
 Zespół Szkół Ponadgimnazjalnych

Sport 
 Wda Świecie football club
 Polpak Świecie basketball team

Notable residents
 Heinrich von Plauen (the Elder) (ca. 1370–1429), 27th grand master of the Teutonic Order
 Oskar Cassel  (1849–1923), German liberal politician
 Nikolaus von Halem (1905–1944), German lawyer and resistance fighter 
 Rolf Stein (1911–1999), German-French Sinologist and Tibetologist
 Günther Radusch (1912-1988), Luftwaffe pilot
  (born 1932), Polish legal historian, professor, academic lecturer
  (1937–2007), Polish writer and publicist
 Janusz Józefowicz (born 1959), Polish director, choreographer, creator of Metro (musical)
 Jacek Bobrowicz (born 1962), retired Polish football player
  (born 1967), Polish painter
 Aleksy Kuziemski (born 1977), Polish professional boxer 
 Dawid Konarski (born 1989), Polish volleyball player, member of the Poland men's national volleyball team, 2014 and 2018 World Champion
 Paweł Paczkowski (born 1993), Polish handball player, member of the Poland men's national handball team

Footnotes 

Cities and towns in Kuyavian-Pomeranian Voivodeship
Populated places on the Vistula
Świecie County
Pomeranian Voivodeship (1919–1939)
Kuyavian-Pomeranian Voivodeship